Black Hawk Down is a 2001 war film directed and produced by Ridley Scott, and co-produced by Jerry Bruckheimer, from a screenplay by Ken Nolan. It is based on the 1999 non-fiction book of the same name by journalist Mark Bowden, about the U.S. military's 1993 raid in Mogadishu. The film features a large ensemble cast, including Josh Hartnett, Ewan McGregor, Eric Bana, Tom Sizemore, William Fichtner, Jason Isaacs, Sam Shepard, Jeremy Piven, Ioan Gruffudd, Ewen Bremner, Hugh Dancy, and Tom Hardy in his first film role. Orlando Bloom, Ty Burrell, and Nikolaj Coster-Waldau also have minor roles.

Black Hawk Down had a limited release on December 28, 2001, and went into the public on January 18, 2002. The film received positive reviews from film critics, although it was criticized for inaccuracies. The film performed modestly well at the box office, grossing $172 million worldwide against a production budget of $92 to $110 million. Black Hawk Down won two Academy Awards for Best Film Editing and Best Sound at the 74th Academy Awards. In 2006, an extended cut of the film was released on DVD. The cut contains an additional eight minutes of footage, increasing the running time to 152 minutes. This extended cut was released on Blu-ray and in 4K on May 7, 2019.

Plot
In 1992, amidst the Somali Civil War and the dissolution of the central government, the United Nations Security Council authorizes a military operation with a peacekeeping mandate. However, conflict ensues between the UN and the Mogadishu-based militia loyal to Mohamed Farrah Aidid. In response, U.S. President Clinton deploys Task Force Ranger – consisting of 3rd Battalion/75th Ranger Regiment, Delta Force operators, and flight crew of the 160th SOAR – to Mogadishu to capture Aidid, who has proclaimed himself president and steals Red Cross food shipments.

Outside Mogadishu, Rangers and Delta Force capture Osman Ali Atto, a faction leader selling arms to Aidid's militia. The US plans a mission to capture Omar Salad Elmi and Abdi Hassan Awale Qeybdiid, two of Aidid's top advisers.

Prior to the mission, Staff Sergeant Matthew Eversmann receives his first command, of Ranger Chalk Four, after his lieutenant has a seizure. Members of his chalk include fresh 18-year-old Private First Class Todd Blackburn and Specialist John Grimes, a former desk clerk. 

The operation begins, and Delta Force operators capture Aidid's advisers inside the target building while the Rangers and helicopters escorting the ground convoy take heavy fire from the rallying militia. Blackburn is severely injured when he falls from one of the Black Hawk helicopters, so three Humvees led by Staff Sergeant Jeff Struecker are detached from the convoy to return Blackburn to the UN-held Mogadishu Airport. Grimes is separated from the rest of Eversmann's chalk after surviving an RPG explosion.

Just after Struecker's column departs, Black Hawk Super Six-One, piloted by Chief Warrant Officer Clifton "Elvis" Wolcott, is shot down by a rocket-propelled grenade. Wolcott and his co-pilot are killed, two crew chiefs are wounded, and two Delta Force snipers on board escape in an MH-6 Little Bird helicopter though one dies later from his wounds.

The ground forces are rerouted to converge on the crash site. The militia erects roadblocks, preventing Lieutenant Colonel Danny McKnight's Humvee column from reaching the area and forcing them to sustain heavy casualties. Meanwhile, two Ranger chalks, including Eversmann's unit, reach the crash site and set up a defensive perimeter. However, another helicopter, Super Six-Four piloted by Chief Warrant Officer Michael Durant, is also shot down by a rocket-propelled grenade and crashes several blocks away.

With the primary Ranger forces led by Captain Mike Steele pinned down and sustaining heavy casualties, no ground forces can reach Super Six-Four or reinforce the Rangers defending Super Six-One. Two Delta Force snipers, Sergeant First Class Randy Shughart and Master Sergeant Gary Gordon, are inserted by helicopter to secure Super Six-Fours crash site, where they find Durant still alive. Despite their heroic actions, the site is eventually overrun, Gordon and Shughart are killed, and Durant is captured.

McKnight's column relinquishes their attempt to reach Six-Ones crash site, and returns to base with their prisoners and the casualties. The men prepare to go back to extract the Rangers and the fallen pilots and Major General Garrison asks for reinforcements from the 10th Mountain Division, including Malaysian and Pakistani armored units from the UN coalition.

As night falls, Aidid's militia launches a sustained assault on the trapped Americans at Super Six-Ones crash site. The militants are held off throughout the night by strafing runs and rocket attacks from AH-6J Little Bird helicopter gunships until the 10th Mountain Division's relief column is able to reach the American soldiers. The wounded and casualties are evacuated in the vehicles, but a few Rangers and Delta Force soldiers are forced to run on foot from the crash site to reach the Safe Zone at the soccer stadium.

End titles
The end titles recount the immediate aftermath of the mission and the end of US military operations in Somalia: Michael Durant was released after 11 days of captivity, after which President Bill Clinton withdrew all US forces from Somalia. During the raid, 19 American soldiers and more than 1,000 Somalis died. The names of the 19 soldiers who died are listed by name, including Gordon and Shughart, the first soldiers to receive the Medal of Honor posthumously since the Vietnam War. Mohamed Farah Aidid was killed in 1996; General Garrison retired the following day.

Cast

 75th Ranger Regiment
 Josh Hartnett as SSG Matt Eversmann
 Ewan McGregor as SPC John "Grimesey" Grimes (based on SPC John Stebbins)
 Tom Sizemore as LTC Danny McKnight
 Ewen Bremner as SPC Shawn Nelson
 Gabriel Casseus as SPC Mike Kurth
 Hugh Dancy as SFC Kurt "Doc" Schmid
 Ioan Gruffudd as LT John Beales
 Tom Guiry as SGT Ed Yurek
 Charlie Hofheimer as CPL Jamie Smith
 Danny Hoch as SGT Dominick Pilla
 Jason Isaacs as CPT Mike Steele
 Brendan Sexton III as PVT Richard "Alphabet" Kowalewski
 Brian Van Holt as SSG Jeff Struecker
 Ian Virgo as PFC John Waddell
 Tom Hardy as SPC Lance Twombly
 Gregory Sporleder as SGT Scott Galentine
 Carmine Giovinazzo as SGT Mike Goodale
 Chris Beetem as SGT Casey Joyce
 Tac Fitzgerald as SPC Brad Thomas
 Matthew Marsden as SPC Dale Sizemore
 Orlando Bloom as PFC Todd Blackburn
 Enrique Murciano as SGT Lorenzo Ruiz
 Michael Roof as PVT John Maddox
 Kent Linville as PFC Clay Othic
 Norman Campbell Rees as LT Tom DiTomasso
 Corey Johnson as US Army medic in Pakistan stadium

Delta Force
 Sam Shepard as MG William F. Garrison
 Eric Bana as SFC Norm "Hoot" Gibson (based on SFC John Macejunas, SFC Norm Hooten, USMC Cpl Thanh Nguyen, and SFC Matthew Rierson)
 William Fichtner as SFC Jeff Sanderson (based on SFC Paul R. Howe)
 Kim Coates as MSG Chris Wex (based on MSG Tim "Griz" Martin)
 Steven Ford as LTC Joe Cribbs (based on LTC Lee Van Arsdale)
 Željko Ivanek as LTC Gary L. Harrell
 Johnny Strong as SFC Randy Shughart
 Nikolaj Coster-Waldau as MSG Gary Gordon
 Richard Tyson as SSG Daniel Busch

 160th SOAR (Night Stalkers)
 Ron Eldard as CW4 Michael Durant, pilot of Super 64
 Glenn Morshower as COL Thomas Matthews, commander of 1st Battalion, 160th SOAR
 Jeremy Piven as CW4 Clifton Wolcott, pilot of Super 61
 Boyd Kestner as CW3 Mike Goffena, pilot of Super 62
 Pavel Vokoun as CW3 Bull Briley, co-pilot of Super 61
 Jason Hildebrandt as CW3 Dan Jollota, pilot of Super 68
 Keith Jones as himself, co-pilot of Star 41

Miscellaneous
 George Harris as Osman Atto
 Razaaq Adoti as Yousuf Dahir Mo'alim, the main commander of Aidid's militia in the film
 Treva Etienne as Firimbi, propaganda minister for Aidid and Durant's caretaker
 Ty Burrell as United States Air Force Pararescue TSgt Timothy A. Wilkinson
 Dan Woods as United States Air Force Pararescue MSG Scott C. Fales
 Giannina Facio as Stephanie Shughart

Production
Adapting Black Hawk Down: a Story of Modern War (1999) by Mark Bowden was the idea of director Simon West, who suggested to Jerry Bruckheimer that he should buy the film rights and let West direct. West felt too tired after working on Lara Croft: Tomb Raider (2001), so he decided to drop out (West later said that he regretted the decision).

Ken Nolan was credited as screenwriter, and others contributed uncredited: Mark Bowden wrote an adaptation of his own book, Stephen Gaghan was hired to do a rewrite, Steven Zaillian and Ezna Sands rewrote the majority of Gaghan and Nolan's work, actor Sam Shepard (MGen. Garrison) rewrote some of his own dialogue, and Eric Roth wrote Josh Hartnett and Eric Bana's concluding speeches. Ken Nolan was on set for four months rewriting his script and the previous work by Gaghan, Zaillian, and Bowden. He was given sole screenwriting credit by a WGA committee.

The book relied on a dramatization of participant accounts, which were the basis of the movie. SPC John Stebbins was renamed as fictional "John Grimes." Stebbins had been convicted by court martial in 1999 for the rape and forcible sodomy of his six-year-old daughter. Mark Bowden said the Pentagon, ever sensitive about public image, decided to alter factual history by requesting the change. Bowden wrote early screenplay drafts, before Bruckheimer gave it to screenwriter Nolan. The POW-captor conversation, between pilot Mike Durant and militiaman Firimbi, is from a Bowden script draft.

To keep the film at a manageable length, 100 key figures in the book were condensed to 39. The movie also does not feature any Somali actors. Additionally, no Somali consultants were hired for accuracy, according to writer Bowden.

For military verisimilitude, the Ranger actors took a one-week Ranger familiarization course at Fort Benning, the Delta Force actors took a two-week commando course from the 1st Special Warfare Training Group at Fort Bragg, and Ron Eldard and the actors playing 160th SOAR helicopter pilots were lectured by captured aviator Michael Durant at Fort Campbell.

The U.S. Army supplied the materiel and the helicopters from the 160th Special Operations Aviation Regiment. Most pilots (e.g., Keith Jones, who speaks some dialogue) had participated in the historic battle on October 3–4, 1993.

On the last day of their week-long Army Ranger orientation at Fort Benning, the actors who portrayed the Rangers received letters slipped under their doors. It thanked them for their hard work, and asked them to "tell our story true", signed with the names of the men who died in the Mogadishu firefight. A platoon of Rangers from B-3/75 did the fast-roping scenes and appeared as extras; John Collette, a Ranger Specialist during the battle, served as a stunt performer.

Many of the actors bonded with the soldiers who trained them for their roles. Actor Tom Sizemore said, "What really got me at training camp was the Ranger Creed. I don't think most of us can understand that kind of mutual devotion. It's like having 200 best friends and every single one of them would die for you".

Filming began in March 2001 in Salé, Morocco, and concluded in late June.

Although the filmmakers considered filming in Jordan, they found the city of Amman too built up and landlocked. Scott and production designer Arthur Max subsequently turned to Morocco, where they had previously worked on Gladiator. Scott preferred that urban setting for authenticity. Most of the film was photographed in the cities of Rabat and Salé; the Task Force Ranger base sequences were filmed at Kénitra and Mehdya.

Music

The musical score for Black Hawk Down was composed by Hans Zimmer, who previously collaborated with director Scott on several films including Thelma & Louise (1991) and Gladiator (2000). Zimmer developed the score through a collaboration with a variety of musicians that blended "east African rhythms and sounds with a more conventional synthesizer approach." In doing so, Zimmer avoided a more traditional composition in favor of an experimental approach that would match the tone of the film. "I wanted to do it like the way the movie was," said Zimmer. "So I got myself a band together and we just went into my studio [...] and we'd just be flailing away at the picture, I mean, you know with great energy." A soundtrack album was released on January 15, 2002, by Decca Records.

Reception

Box office
Black Hawk Down had a limited release in four theaters on December 28, 2001, in order to be eligible for the 2001 Oscars. It earned $179,823 in its first weekend, averaging $44,956 per theater. On January 11, 2002, the release expanded to 16 theaters and continued to do well with a weekly gross of $1,118,003 and an average daily per theater gross of $9,982. On January 18, 2002, the film had its wide release, opening at 3,101 theaters and earning $28,611,736 in its first wide-release weekend to finish first at the box office for the weekend. Opening on the Martin Luther King holiday, the film grossed $5,014,475 on the holiday of Monday, January 21, 2002, for a 4-day weekend total of $33,628,211. Only Titanic had previously grossed more money over the Martin Luther King holiday weekend. Black Hawk Down finished first at the box office during its first three weeks of wide release. When the film closed on April 14, 2002, after its 15th week, it had grossed $108,638,746 domestically and $64,350,906 overseas for a worldwide total of $172,989,651.

Critical response
On Rotten Tomatoes the film has an approval rating of 76% based on 173 reviews, with an average rating of 7.00/10. The website's critical consensus reads, "Though it's light on character development and cultural empathy, Black Hawk Down is a visceral, pulse-pounding portrait of war, elevated by Ridley Scott's superb technical skill." On Metacritic, the film has a weighted average score of 74 out of 100, based on reviews from 33 critics, indicating "generally favorable reviews". Audiences surveyed by CinemaScore gave the film an average grade of "A−" on an A+ to F scale.

Roger Ebert of the Chicago Sun-Times gave the film four stars out of four, saying that films like this "help audiences understand and sympathize with the actual experiences of combat troops, instead of trivializing them into entertainments." Empire magazine gave it a verdict of "ambitious, sumptuously framed, and frenetic, Black Hawk Down is nonetheless a rare find of a war movie which dares to turn genre convention on its head". Mike Clark of USA Today wrote that the film "extols the sheer professionalism of America's elite Delta Force—even in the unforeseen disaster that was 1993's Battle of Mogadishu," and praised Scott's direction: "in relating the conflict, in which 18 Americans died and 70-plus were injured, the standard getting-to-know-you war-film characterizations are downplayed. While some may regard this as a shortcoming, it is, in fact, a virtue".

The film has had a small cultural legacy, which has been studied academically by media analysts dissecting how media reflects American perceptions of war. Newsweek writer Evan Thomas considered the movie one of the most culturally significant films of the George W. Bush presidency. He suggested that although the film was presented as being anti-war, it was at its core pro-war. He further wrote that "though it depicted a shameful defeat, the soldiers were heroes willing to die for their brothers in arms ... The movie showed brutal scenes of killing, but also courage, stoicism and honor ... The overall effect was stirring, if slightly pornographic, and it seemed to enhance the desire of Americans for a thumping war to avenge 9/11."

Stephen A. Klien, writing in Critical Studies in Media Communication, argued that the film's sensational rendering of war had the effect of encouraging audiences to empathize with the film's pro-soldier leitmotif and "conflate personal support of American soldiers with support of American military policy" and discourage "critical public discourse concerning justification for and execution of military interventionist policy."

Accolades
Black Hawk Down received four Academy Award nominations for Best Director (lost to A Beautiful Mind) and Best Cinematography (lost to The Lord of the Rings: The Fellowship of the Ring) and won two Oscars for Best Sound and Best Film Editing. It received three BAFTA Award nominations for Best Cinematography, Best Sound and Best Editing.

Controversies and inaccuracies
Soon after Black Hawk Downs release, the Somali Justice Advocacy Center (SJAC) in California denounced what they felt was its brutal and dehumanizing depiction of Somalis and called for its boycott. The SJAC in Minnesota called for a boycott of the film for its portrayal of Somalis as "savage beasts shooting each other."

In a radio interview, Brendan Sexton, who portrayed fallen ranger PVT. Richard "Alphabet" Kowalewski, said the version of the film which made it onto theater screens significantly differed from the one recounted in the original script. According to him, many scenes asking hard questions of the US regarding the violent realities of war and the true purpose of their mission in Somalia were cut.

In a review featured in The New York Times, film critic Elvis Mitchell expressed dissatisfaction with the film's "lack of characterization" and opined that the film "reeks of glumly staged racism". Owen Gleiberman and Sean Burns, the film critics for Entertainment Weekly and the alternative newspaper Philadelphia Weekly, respectively, echoed the sentiment that the depiction was racist.

American film critic Wheeler Winston Dixon also found the film's "absence of motivation and characterization" disturbing, and wrote that while American audiences might find the film to be a "paean to patriotism", other audiences might find it to be a "deliberately hostile enterprise"; nevertheless, Dixon lauded the film's "spectacular display of pyrotechnics coupled with equally adroit editing."

Jerry Bruckheimer, the film's producer, rejected such claims on The O'Reilly Factor, putting them down to political correctness in part due to Hollywood's liberal leanings.

Somali nationals charge that the African actors chosen to play the Somalis in the film do not resemble the culturally unique features of the Horn of Africa, nor does the language they communicate in sound like the Afro-Asiatic tongue spoken by the Somali people. They also claim the abrasive way lines are delivered and lack of authenticity regarding Somali culture fails to capture the tone, mannerisms, and spirit of actual life in Somalia. No Somali actors were used in the movie.

In an interview with the BBC, the faction leader Osman Ali Atto said that many aspects of the film are factually incorrect. Taking exception with the ostentatious depiction of his character, Ali Atto claimed he looks nothing like the actor who portrayed him, nor that he smoked cigars or wore earrings. These details were later confirmed by SEAL Team Six sniper Howard E. Wasdin in his 2012 memoirs. Wasdin also indicated that while the character in the movie ridiculed his captors, in reality, Atto seemed concerned that Wasdin and his men had been sent to kill rather than apprehend him. Atto additionally stated that he had not been consulted about the project, nor was he approached for permission to use his likeness, and that the film sequence re-enacting his arrest contained several inaccuracies:

Navy SEAL Wasdin similarly remarked that while olive green military rigger's tape was used to mark the roof of the car in question in the movie, his team in actuality managed to track down Atto's whereabouts using a much more sophisticated technique involving the implantation of a homing device. This was hidden in a cane presented to Atto as a gift from a contact who routinely met with him, which eventually led the team directly to the faction leader.

Malaysian military officials whose own troops were involved in the fighting have likewise raised complaints regarding the film's accuracy. Retired Brigadier-General Abdul Latif Ahmad, who at the time commanded Malaysian forces in Mogadishu, told the AFP news agency that Malaysian moviegoers would be under the erroneous impression that the real battle was fought by the Americans alone, with Malaysian troops relegated to serving as "mere bus drivers to ferry them out".

General Pervez Musharraf, who later became President of Pakistan after a coup, similarly accused the filmmakers of not crediting the work done by the Pakistani soldiers. In his autobiography In the Line of Fire: A Memoir, Musharraf wrote:

Somalis attending a screening of a pirated copy of the film at a theater in Mogadishu claimed the film ignored the deaths of hundreds, if not thousands, of civilian adults and children caused by the Americans.

Mogadishu Mile
It is often believed that the soldiers involved in the Mogadishu Mile had to run all the way to the Mogadiscio Stadium, as shown in the film. However, in that scene the filmmakers took artistic license and dramatized the event, departing from the book. In the film, the Mogadishu Mile ends with about a dozen soldiers entering the Mogadiscio Stadium having run all the way through the city. In the book, it ends with soldiers reaching a rendezvous point on National Street (in the opposite direction from the stadium):

The Rangers and Delta Force soldiers were not the only members of the U.S. military operation who walked the Mogadishu Mile; they included two CSO Marines that were also joined by soldiers from the U.S. 10th Mountain Division:

For the most part, the scene in the film where the convoy leaves the soldiers running through the city streets alone does not accurately portray what really happened:

The "Only the dead have seen the end of war" quote 
The film begins with the quote "Only the dead have seen the end of war.", which is misattributed to Plato. Research shows this quote first appeared in the works of George Santayana.

See also

 Battle of Mogadishu (1993)
 Black Hawk Down (book)

References

Bibliography

External links
 
 
 
 
 
 
 

American films based on actual events
American war films
Battle of Mogadishu (1993)
British films based on actual events
British war films
Columbia Pictures films
Films about Delta Force
Films about shot-down aviators
Films based on non-fiction books
Films directed by Ridley Scott
Films produced by Jerry Bruckheimer
Films set in 1993
Films set in Somalia
Films set in Mogadishu
Films shot in Morocco
Films that won the Best Sound Mixing Academy Award
Films whose editor won the Best Film Editing Academy Award
Revolution Studios films
Scott Free Productions films
Somali Civil War films
Somali-language films
Films about United States Army Rangers
War films based on actual events
Films scored by Hans Zimmer
2000s war films
Films with screenplays by Ken Nolan
Impact of the September 11 attacks on cinema
Political controversies in film
Race-related controversies in film
Film controversies in the United States
Film controversies
2000s English-language films
2000s American films
2000s British films